In graph theory, a branch of mathematics, the matching preclusion number of a graph G (denoted mp(G)) is the minimum number of edges whose deletion results in the destruction of a perfect matching or near-perfect matching (a matching that covers all but one vertex in a graph with an odd number of vertices). Matching preclusion measures the robustness of a graph as a communications network topology for distributed algorithms that require each node of the distributed system to be matched with a neighboring partner node.

In many graphs, mp(G) is equal to the minimum degree of any vertex in the graph, because deleting all edges incident to a single vertex prevents it from being matched. This set of edges is called a trivial matching preclusion set. A variant definition, the conditional matching preclusion number, asks for the minimum number of edges the deletion of which results in a graph that has neither a perfect or near-perfect matching nor any isolated vertices.

It is NP-complete to test whether the matching preclusion number of a given graph is below a given threshold.

The strong matching preclusion number (or simply, SMP number) is a generalization of the matching preclusion number; the SMP number of a graph G, smp(G) is the minimum number of vertices and/or edges whose deletion results in a graph that has neither perfect matchings nor almost-perfect matchings.

Other numbers defined in a similar way by edge deletion in an undirected graph include the edge connectivity, the minimum number of edges to delete in order to disconnect the graph, and the cyclomatic number, the minimum number of edges to delete in order to eliminate all cycles.

References 

Graph invariants
Matching (graph theory)